Doane University is a private university in Crete, Nebraska.  It has additional campuses in Lincoln and Omaha, as well as online programs.

History
Doane College was founded on July 11, 1872, by Thomas Doane, chief civil engineer for the Burlington and Missouri River Railroad. David Brainerd Perry was the first college president. He served until his death in 1912.

Doane College was renamed Doane University in May 2016.

The University has had over 70 Fulbright Scholars since the program began in 1946.

Campuses 

Doane's residential campus is in Crete, Nebraska. This campus is over 300 acres. Notable buildings or areas on campus include:
 Doane University Historic Buildings, including Gaylord Hall, Boswell Observatory and Whitcomb Conservatory/Lee Memorial Chapel.
 Doane University Osterhout Arboretum
Doane's non-residential programs take place mainly on the Lincoln and Omaha campuses, and online.

Academics

Colleges and schools 

 The College of Arts and Sciences offers over 25 undergraduate majors. It is led by Dean Pedro Maligo.
 The College of Business offers undergraduate majors in accounting, agribusiness, business administration, and economics. Two graduate degrees are also offered: Master of Arts in Leadership and a Master of Business Administration. It is led by Dean Jennifer Bossard.
 The College of Education offers undergraduate degrees in Elementary Education, Special Education, Secondary Education, and Physical and Health Education. Graduate programs include: Masters of Education in Curriculum & Instruction, Educational Leadership, and School Counseling; Master of Arts in Counseling; Education Specialist Degree; Doctorate of Education; and Initial Certification at the Advanced Level (also known as the Fast Track Program). It is led by Dean Tim Frey.
 The School of Innovative Learning (SIL) offers undergraduate majors in health sciences and exercise science. It also houses the Masters Degree in Instructional Design and Technology. SIL is also the home of Doane's Open Learning Academy, which offers online classes with transferable credits for non-degree seeking students. DoaneX, a partnership with MOOC platform edX, is also housed under SIL.

Accreditations 
Doane University is accredited by the Higher Learning Commission and the Nebraska Coordinating Commission of Post-Secondary Education. Several programs also hold specialized accreditations.

 The Teacher Education unit at Doane University is accredited by the Council for the Accreditation of Educator Preparation (CAEP).
 The Master of Arts in Counseling program was accredited by The Council for Accreditation of Counseling and Related Educational Programs (CACREP) in 2020.
 The Music Department is accredited by the National Association of Schools of Music.
 As of 2021, the Bachelor of Science in Engineering program is in the process of seeking accreditation through ABET.

Student media
Doane University is the home of the Doane Owl, the oldest student-run newspaper in the state of Nebraska. The Owl initially started as a literary publication before evolving into a traditional newspaper covering both Doane and Crete, Nebraska issues.
	
Regarding student broadcasting, Doane's college radio station is KDNE. Programming on KDNE ranges from sports and news to student-run music specialty shows.
	
DCTV is the university's television station.

Athletics
The Doane athletic teams are called the Tigers. The university is a member of the National Association of Intercollegiate Athletics (NAIA), primarily competing in the Great Plains Athletic Conference (GPAC) since the 1969–70 academic year.

Doane competes in 23 intercollegiate varsity sports. Men's sports include baseball, basketball, cross country, football, golf, soccer, tennis, track & field (indoor and outdoor) and wrestling; while women's sports include basketball, cross country, golf, soccer, softball, tennis, track & field (indoor and outdoor), volleyball and wrestling; and co-ed sports include cheerleading, dance, and shotgun sports.

Football
The first college football coach at Doane was F.P. Reed, who led the team to a 1–1 record. Other coaches in its football history include Al Papik, Tommie Frazier, Matt Franzen and current head coach Chris Bessler.

1905 Nebraska State College Football Champions.  After defeating Bellevue College, the 1905 Doane College football team became the Nebraska State Football Champions.  Considered a formidable team, in no small part due to their combined weight, the Doane team lost their subsequent game with University of Nebraska Cornhuskers, 43–5.  The largest player on the Doane team was 220 pound, left guard, Claude LeRoy Farrow of Aurora, Nebraska.

Doane's football team has participated in three bowl games, winning two and tying one. The first was the 1950 Bean Bowl where they defeated Colorado State College by a score of 14–6.  Doane then had back-to-back appearances in the Mineral Water Bowl in 1967 and 1968. They have qualified for the NAIA National Playoffs six times, most recently in 2016, and were semifinalist in 1972 and 1997.

Notable alumni

Raymonn Adams – running back in Canadian Football League
Henry Pratt Fairchild – sociologist and educator
Weldon Kees – poet, painter, filmmaker, and jazz musician
Joseph D. Leitch US Army major general, attended 1882-1883
Toshihiro Takami '56 – won the Japanese version of the Nobel Peace Prize for his extensive work in sustainable farming in Asia and Africa
Michael Aung-Thwin '69 - Burmese historian and academic
Robert Taylor – actor, star of films from 1930s to '50s
Ralph W. Tyler '21 – Developed the ACT test
Robert Van Pelt – judge, U.S. District Court, 1957–88
John Perry – philosopher and professor of philosophy at Stanford University
Bob Stitt – football head coach, University of Montana
Samantha Marie Ware – actress and singer
Claude E. Welch '27 – Chief surgeon of the Pope rolling the assassination attempt in 1981
Douglas L. Wilson – two-time recipient of Lincoln Prize and professor at Knox College

Issues

Academic freedom 
In 2020 the director of the Perkins library came under fire for a "Parties of the Past" exhibit of historical photographs which included two photos of students wearing blackface in 1926. The photos and then the entire exhibit was taken down by administrators who placed the library director on leave to the objection of the faculty. Doane was then named one of the "Worst Colleges for Free Speech" by the Foundation for Individual Rights in Education. The university later reinstated the library director.

References

External links 
 
 Official athletics website

Liberal arts colleges in Nebraska
Universities and colleges affiliated with the United Church of Christ
Educational institutions established in 1872
Education in Saline County, Nebraska
Buildings and structures in Saline County, Nebraska
1872 establishments in Nebraska
Great Plains Athletic Conference schools
Private universities and colleges in Nebraska